Trevard Lindley (born February 2, 1986) is a former American football cornerback. He was drafted by the Philadelphia Eagles in the fourth round of the 2010 NFL Draft. He played college football at Kentucky.

Professional career

Pre-draft
Prior to the 2010 NFL Draft, Lindley was considered one of the top prospects available.

Philadelphia Eagles
Lindley was selected in the fourth round (105th overall) of the 2010 NFL Draft by the Philadelphia Eagles. He was signed to a four-year contract on June 4, 2010.

On September 7, 2011, Lindley was waived by the Eagles. He was re-signed by the team following the 2011 season on January 3, 2012. He was cut again September 1, 2012 to make roster room for former Houston Texans offensive lineman Nathan Menkin.

On January 2, 2013, Lindley re-signed with the Eagles, once again, for the third time. He was released from his contract on August 30, 2013.

References

External links
Philadelphia Eagles bio
Kentucky Wildcats bio

1986 births
Living people
People from Lithia Springs, Georgia
Sportspeople from the Atlanta metropolitan area
Players of American football from Georgia (U.S. state)
American football cornerbacks
Kentucky Wildcats football players
Philadelphia Eagles players
Blacktips (FXFL) players